Another Life: A Memoir of Other People is an autobiography written by Simon & Schuster publisher Michael Korda and published in the United States in 1999. In this memoir Korda gives an insider account of the world of publishing from the late 1950s through 1990s and creates intimate portraits of the authors, editors, and celebrities he has worked with over the decades.

Synopsis 
In Another Life: A Memoir of Other People describes the process of book publishing from the acquisition of a book or author through editing and publication of a manuscript. Korda shares anecdotes about the publishing lunch and anecdotes about working with celebrities like Joan Crawford, Ronald Reagan and agent Irving Lazar. Korda also shares lessons he has learned about the business of publishing.

A good portion of the book describes the changes in the publishing industry over the decades. Korda profiles the publisher, editors and executives that worked for Simon & Schuster such as Robert Gottlieb, Richard E. Snyder, Joni Evans and others. He also gives an account of Simon & Schuster's buy-out by Gulf+Western in 1975 and the rise of publishing mergers and consolidation beginning in the 1970s. He writes about trends in the history of publishing during this time such as the rise of the chain superstores and the changes to publishing due to the rise of technology.

Korda views that publishing is a "reactive business" and that editors and publishers do not make taste or determine people's political views or affect social change but responds to what may be already there. In the book he uses the example of Harriet Beecher Stowe's Uncle Tom's Cabin. Korda's contention isn't that Stowe affected opinions but made apparent opinions that were already felt by the majority on the subject of slavery and brought it to the foreground.

Reviews and commercial reception 
The memoir was received warmly by the press. Publishers Weekly described the book " a more candid, engaging and warmly knowledgeable survey of the past 40 years of American publishing cannot be imagined." The New York Times wrote, "The recollection of his adventures in the book trade is a joy to read not only because Korda knows how to tell a good story but also because he never forgets that it is not in the nature of book publishers 'to harbor negative thoughts,' because 'the lifeblood of publishing is enthusiasm, after all, not caution.' Kirkus Reviews called it, "more entertaining than lunch with a power editor at the Four Seasons Grill--full of delicious gossip plus a lesson or two in book publishing.

In 2012 the book was profiled in The New Yorker under What We Are Reading by Michael Agger. Agger states the book "stands as an idiosyncratic history of book publishing’s shift from small, founder-driven houses into a junior wing of the entertainment industry."

Content

Authors and celebrities profiled 

 Alexa Korda
 Alexander Korda
 Ariel Durant
 Barry Diller
 Billy Rose
 Bob Woodward
 Carl Bernstein
 Carlos Casteneda
 Charles G. Bluhdorn
 Claus Von Bulow
 Clay Felker
 Cornelius Ryan
 Dariel Tefler
 David Eisenhower
 Dominique Lapierre
 Fannie Hurst
 Garson Kanin
 Graham Greene
 Gypsy Rose Lee
 Harold Robbins
 Jackie Collins
 Jesse Jackson
 Jimmy Carter
 Joan Collins
 Jacqueline Susann
 Joan Crawford
 Joseph Bonanno
 Julie Nixon Eisenhower
 Kitty Kelley
 Irving Lazar
 Irving Mansfield
 Irving Wallace
 Ladislas Farago
 Larry Collins
 Larry McMurtry
 Marilyn Monroe
 Martin S. Davis
 Merle Oberon
 Milton H. Greene
 Nick Pillegi
 Patrick Murphy
 Paul Hemphill
 Ray Girardin
 R.F. Delderfield
 Richard Adams
 Richard Nixon
 Robert Evans
 Robert Lindsey
 Robert Moses
 Rona Jaffe
 Ronald Reagan
 S.J. Perelman
 Shirley Conran
 Sidney Kingsley
 W. Somerset Maugham
 Stanley Sporkin
 Sunny Von Bulow
 Susan Howatch
 Sylvia Wallace
 Tennessee Williams
 Truman Capote
 Will Durant
 William L. Laurence
 Zoltan Korda

Editors, agents and publishers 

 Alfred A. Knopf
 Bennet Cerf
 Bill Adler
 Blanche Knopf
 Candida Donadio
 David Obst
 Doubleday
 George Weidenfeld
 Gulf + Western
 Harcourt
 Herbert M. Alexander
 Henry Holt
 Jason Epstein
 Joni Evans
 Joseph Barnes
 Justin D. Kaplan
 Kathleen Aston Casey
 Linden Press
 Lynn Nesbit
 Kay Brown
 Larry Ashmead
 Leon Shimkin
 Macmillan Publishing
 M. Lincoln Schuster
 Maxwell Perkins
 Milly Marmur
 Morris Helprin
 Nan Talese
 Nina Bourne
 Patricia Soliman
 Paul Gitlin
 Peter Mayer
 Peter Schwed
 Phyliss Grann
 Phyliss Jackson
 Random House
 Ray Schuster
 Richard Klugar
 Richard Simon
 Richard E. Snyder
 Robert Gottlieb
 Robert Maxwell
 S.I. Newhouse
 Seymour Hersh
 Simon & Schuster
 Tina Brown
 Tony Godwin
 William Jovanovich

Publication 
Another Life: A Memoir of Other People was first published in hardcover by Random House in 1999. A trade paperback edition came out in 2000.

References

External links 
Book party for Another Life hosted by Kitty Kelley, June 7, 1999, C-SPAN
Booknotes interview with Korda on Another Life, July 11, 1999

1999 non-fiction books
American autobiographies
Literary autobiographies
American memoirs
Random House books